Hohhot Shengle International Airport  is an airport being built to serve Hohhot, the capital of Inner Mongolia Autonomous Region in north China. Once completed it will replace the existing Baita International Airport as the city's main airport. It is located in Qiaoshiying Township, Horinger County, south of the city center.

History 
Hohhot is currently served by Baita International Airport. With the rapid expansion of the city, the airport is now surrounded by urban area. It has no more room to expand to accommodate growing traffic, while the presence of the airport in the middle of the city has severely restricted urban development.

In April 2012, the city of Hohhot launched the project to build a new airport to replace Baita Airport. It chose a site in Qiaoshiying Township, Horinger County, south of the city center, and named it Hohhot Shengle International Airport. The name refers to Shengle, capital of the Kingdom of Dai in the 4th century CE. In September 2013, an office overseeing the construction of the airport was established in Horinger and began acquiring land and relocating residents. The Civil Aviation Administration of China evaluated the site starting in December 2013 and gave its approval in 2015. On 15 January 2019, the airport was approved by the National Development and Reform Commission.

Facilities and construction 
It will have a  terminal building, parking aprons for 125 aircraft, a  transit hub, and a  parking garage. The airport is projected to serve 28 million passengers per year by 2030, as well as 320,000 tons of cargo.

The Baobei River (宝贝河) will be diverted for the new airport.

Transport
Shengle Airport will served by the planned Line 4 of Hohhot Metro.

References 

Airports in Inner Mongolia
Buildings and structures in Hohhot
Proposed airports in China